The 2018 Vuelta a San Juan was a road cycling stage race that took place in the San Juan Province of Argentina between 21 and 28 January 2018. The race was rated as a 2.1 event as part of the 2018 UCI America Tour, and was the 36th edition of the Vuelta a San Juan. Initially, the race was won by Gonzalo Najar, who was later disqualified for a failed doping test. The result was then given to the rider originally in second place, Óscar Sevilla.

Teams
Twenty-seven teams started the race. Each team had a maximum of seven riders:

Route

Stages

Stage 1

Stage 2

Stage 3

Stage 4

Stage 5

Stage 6

Stage 7

Classifications

Classification leadership table

References

2018
2018 UCI America Tour
2018 in Argentine sport